Margaret Jane Briggs (17 April 1892–5 November 1961) was a New Zealand show‑ring rider. She was born in Otakeho, Taranaki, New Zealand on 17 April 1892.

References

1892 births
1961 deaths
New Zealand female equestrians
People from Taranaki
19th-century New Zealand women
20th-century New Zealand women